The 2010 Guatemala City sinkhole was a disaster on 30May2010, in which an area approximately  across and  deep collapsed in Guatemala City's Zona 2, swallowing a three-story factory. The sinkhole occurred for a combination of reasons, including Tropical Storm Agatha, the Pacaya Volcano eruption, and leakage from sewer pipes.

Background

Overall, the risk of sinkholes occurring in Guatemala City is very high and unpredictable. The 2007 Guatemala City sinkhole was formed by fluid from a sewer eroding uncemented volcanic ash, limestone, and other pyroclastic deposits underlying Guatemala City. The hazards around the pipe have since then been mitigated, by improved handling of the city's wastewater and runoff. Several rainstorms also contributed to the sinkhole's collapse, as stormwater percolated into the ground, further dissolving the rocks beneath Guatemala City. The 2010 sinkhole was formed for similar reasons.

Formation

Sewage pipes

The sinkhole formed due to volcanic pumice deposits, upon which Guatemala City is built. These deposits were unconsolidated and of low density, allowing easy erosion. According to Sam Bonis, a geologist at Dartmouth College, leaking pipes went unfixed long enough to create the conditions necessary for sinkhole formation because of lax city zoning regulations and building codes. Bonis also says that the Guatemala City sinkhole is a misnomer: sinkholes have natural causes, but this one was mainly artificial. In addition, according to Bonis, sinkholes are usually formed from limestone but there is no limestone hundreds of metres underneath Guatemala City. Bonis proposes that the sinkhole be renamed a piping feature.

Tropical Storm Agatha

Tropical Storm Agatha was first identified as a trough of low pressure of the western coast of Costa Rica on 24May2010. On May 29, the depression intensified into a tropical storm and was given the name Agatha. By the morning of 30May, the center of Agatha moved over the highest terrain in Central America, resulting in the dissipation of the low-level circulation. Torrential rains from the storm widened the cavity, eventually causing the collapse of the sinkhole.

Pacaya volcano eruption

The eruption prompted officials to shut down the country's international airport. Upon the formation of Agatha, people feared that excessive rainfall from the storm could exacerbate the situation and trigger lahars. This had the effect of clogging the underground pipes with soot, increasing the chances of pipe rupture.

Collapse and aftermath
Mariela Castañón, a reporter for the daily newspaper La Hora, reported that the ground collapsed suddenly, taking a three-story house that was used as a factory, and possibly a security guard, along with it. Electricity poles were also sucked in. Authorities said they could not confirm the security guard's death.

Because of the role played by sewage pipes in the sinkhole's collapse, Sam Bonis, along with other geologists, has demanded that the government inspect the sewer system more regularly.

According to officials, the sinkhole had similarities with another Guatemalan sinkhole which collapsed in 2007, which may also have been formed by ruptured sewage pipes.

On a wider scale, immediately following reports of fatalities due to Agatha, a state of emergency was declared for Guatemala. On 31May, the government started to deploy national aid, and donation centers for victims of the storm were opened across the country. According to the Office for the Coordination of Humanitarian Affairs (OCHA), schools in Guatemala were to be closed until at least 4June.

Filling in the sinkhole

Immediately after the sinkhole's collapse, there were plans to fill it in with a soil cement made from cement, limestone, and water known locally as lodocreto ("mudcrete"). This substance was also used to fill in the 2007 Guatemala City sinkhole. However, another technique, which geologists call the graded-filter technique, in which the sinkhole is filled with successive layers of boulders, smaller rocks, and gravel, could possibly be a better solution. This is because filling the hole in with cement diverts water runoff to other areas, potentially increasing the risk of sinkholes occurring in other parts of the city. The graded-filter technique, on the other hand, allows water to seep through.

References

2010 natural disasters
21st century in Guatemala City
21st-century sinkholes
2010 in Guatemala
Natural disasters in Guatemala
Sinkholes of North America
Landforms of Guatemala